Arcahaie is a commune in the Arcahaie Arrondissement, in the Ouest department of Haiti. In 2015, the commune had 130,306 inhabitants.

Settlements

References 

Populated places in Ouest (department)
Communes of Haiti
Port cities in the Caribbean